"Hallowed be thy name" is a line from the Lord's Prayer in the Bible.

Hallowed Be Thy Name may also refer to:

"Hallowed Be Thy Name" (song), a 1982 song by Iron Maiden
"Hallowed Be Thy Name", a  song by Indecision